Samantha Keala Staab (born March 28, 1997) is an American soccer defender who currently plays for the Washington Spirit in the National Women's Soccer League (NWSL).

Early life
Staab played for the DMCV Sharks in her childhood.

Clemson Tigers
Staab attended Clemson University, where she played for the Tigers women's soccer team from 2015 to 2018. She was selected for the ACC All-Freshman team in 2015 after starting all 20 games in her first season. After making the All-ACC second team in each of the next two years, she was selected to the All-ACC first team in her senior season. At the time of her graduation, her 33 career assists were tied for 4th-most in school history.

Club career

Washington Spirit
Staab was drafted 4th overall in the first round of the 2019 NWSL College Draft by the Washington Spirit. In April, she was signed to the Spirit's senior roster in advance of the 2019 NWSL season. Staab made her professional debut on April 13, 2019, against Sky Blue FC, scoring a 59th-minute goal en route to a 2–0 season-opening win for the Spirit. Staab went on to appear in every minute of the Spirit's season, becoming the second-ever NWSL player to play every minute of her rookie season. She was considered one of the league's top defenders, earning a spot on the May and June 2019 NWSL Team of the Month and she was one of three nominees for Rookie of the Year. In 2020, she played every minute of the Spirit's season. In the NWSL Challenge Cup she converted a header off a set piece in the 77th minute against the Portland Thorns, scoring the Spirit's lone goal in the team's 1-1 tie. In 2022, Staab played every minute of the Spirit's season.

Western Sydney Wanderers
Staab was signed in advance of the 2019–20 W-League season by the Western Sydney Wanderers.  Staab made her debut for the Wanderers on November 14, 2019.

International career
Staab attended training camp with the United States under-19 team in January 2016. Staab was first selected for the United States under-23 team in March 2018 for the 2018 Thorns Spring Invitational. She was called up again for the 2018 Nordic Tournament, where she was the only non-professional player selected for the U.S. roster. She started all three games, and scored the game-winning goal for the United States in the final match, ensuring a first-place result in the tournament.

Honors

Individual
NWSL Team of the Month: May, June 2019
NWSL Rookie of the Year: nominated, 2019

References

External links
 Washington Spirit player profile
 

1997 births
Living people
American women's soccer players
Clemson Tigers women's soccer players
National Women's Soccer League players
Soccer players from San Diego
Washington Spirit draft picks
Washington Spirit players
Women's association football midfielders